A billiard, pool or snooker hall (or parlour, room or club; sometimes compounded as poolhall, poolroom, etc.) is a place where people get together for playing cue sports such as pool, snooker or carom billiards. Such establishments commonly serve alcohol and often have arcade games, slot machines, card games, darts, foosball and other games. Some billiard halls may be combined or integrated with a bowling alley.

History
Pool and billiards developed as an indoor option to substitute for games such as croquet that were played on lawns. Dedicated venues began to appear in the 19th century, and by the early 20th century, billiard and pool halls were common in many countries; in 1915 there were 830 in Chicago.

In North America in the 1950s and 1960s especially, pool halls in particular were perceived as a social ill by many, and laws were passed in many jurisdictions to set age limits at pool halls and restrict gambling and the sale of alcohol. The song "Trouble" in the 1957 hit musical The Music Man lampooned this prejudice (even contrasting carom billiards, requiring "judgement, brains, and maturity", versus pool, said to be a gateway to laziness, gambling, smoking and philandering). Public perception had become less critical by the 1990s.

By the 2010s, with competition from a growing number of competing entertainment venues, as well as the availability of online gambling, revenue from the operation of billiard halls in the United States had declined significantly. In Korea, on the other hand, the pool halls are becoming more popular after years of decline.

In popular culture 

Pool halls feature prominently in the novel and film The Hustler, and their sequel book and movie, The Color of Money, as well as other pool films such as Poolhall Junkies and Shooting Gallery. The historic depth of the American pool hall subculture was touched on in The Color of Money in various ways, including dialogue extolling the virtues of particular landmark venues, the disappointment at discovering one such hall's closure, a comment that regulars at a well-known hall "never leave the street" it is on, and the return of a pool hall janitor in The Hustler as a hall owner decades later in the sequel.

References 

Cue sports
Sports venues by type
Entertainment venues